Mindaugas Stašys (born February 28, 1986) is a Lithuanian professional basketball player who plays the point guard position for BC Gargždai-SC of the Lietuvos krepšinio lyga (LKL).

References

1986 births
Living people
Lithuanian men's basketball players
Basketball players from Klaipėda
Point guards